is a railway station in Sumida, Tokyo, Japan, jointly operated by Tokyo Metro, Tobu Railway, Toei, and Keisei Electric Railway. It is adjacent to the Tokyo Skytree complex.

Lines
Oshiage Station is served by the following lines. It is the terminal station of three lines.
 Keisei Oshiage Line (station number KS45) – through service to the  Toei Asakusa Line
 Tobu Skytree Line (station number TS-03) – through service to the  Tokyo Metro Hanzomon Line
Toei Asakusa Line (station number A-20) – through service to the  Keisei Oshiage Line
 Tokyo Metro Hanzōmon Line (station number Z-14) – through service to the  Tobu Skytree Line

Station layout
There are two sets of platforms, one for Keisei/Toei at level B1, and the other for Tokyo Metro/Tobu at level B3. Each consists of two island platforms serving four tracks.

Keisei/Toei
On the Keisei/Toei section, trains to Nishi-Magome and the Keikyu Network leave from platforms 1, 2 or 3. Trains for Aoto and the Keisei/Hokusō/Shibayama network leave from platforms 3 and 4, although Keisei and Hokusō trains can also use platform 2.

Tokyo Metro/Tobu

Platform 1 is used by through services from the Tobu Skytree Line. Platforms 2 and 3 are used by Hanzomon Line services terminating and starting at this station.

History
The Keisei station opened on 3 November 1912. The Keisei station was moved underground in 1960 in preparation of the opening of Line 1 of the Toei Subway (present day Toei Asakusa Line). Line 1 would open for revenue service on 4 December of that year. 

The Tobu station opened on 19 March 2003.

The Hanzomon Line platforms were inherited by Tokyo Metro after the privatization of the Teito Rapid Transit Authority (TRTA) in 2004.

Station numbering was introduced to all Keisei Line stations on 17 July 2010; Oshiage Station on the Keisei Line was assigned station number KS45.

Surrounding area
The station is located at the Oshiage-eki-mae intersection of Metropolitan Routes 453 and 465 (Asakusa-dōri and Yotsume-dōri respectively).

 Tokyo Skytree

Other Stations
 Tokyo Skytree Station (approximately 10 minutes walk)

See also
 List of railway stations in Japan

References

External links

 Oshiage Station information (Toei)
 Oshiage Station information (Tokyo Metro)
 Oshiage Station information (Tobu) 
 Oshiage Station information (Keisei)

Railway stations in Tokyo
Railway stations in Japan opened in 1912
Tokyo Metro Hanzomon Line
Toei Asakusa Line